3-Hydroxykynurenine is a metabolite of tryptophan, which filters UV light in the human lens. It is one of two pigments identified as responsible for the goldenrod crab spider's (Misumena vatia) yellow coloration.

References

See also
 Kynurenine
 Ommochrome

Amino acids
Phenols